The barredtail corydoras or Cochu's catfish (Corydoras cochui) is a tropical freshwater fish belonging to the Corydoradinae sub-family of the family Callichthyidae. It originates in inland waters in South America, and is found in the Upper Araguaia River basin in Brazil. In the system of "C-Numbers" developed by the German fishkeeping magazine DATZ to identify undescribed species of Corydoras in the aquarium hobby, this fish had been assigned number "C22" until it was correctly identified.

The fish will grow in length up to 1 inches (2.5 centimeters). It feeds on worms, benthic crustaceans, insects, and plant matter. It lays eggs in dense vegetation and adults do not guard the eggs.

The barredtail corydoras is of commercial importance in the aquarium trade industry.

The fish is named in honor of tropical fish importer Ferdinand "Fred" Cochu of the Paramount Aquarium, who collected the type species.

See also
 List of freshwater aquarium fish species

References

External links
 Photos at Fishbase

Corydoras
Taxa named by George S. Myers
Taxa named by Stanley Howard Weitzman
Fish described in 1954